Charles or  Charlie Babcock may refer to:

Charles Babcock (architect) (1829–1913), American architect
Charles Almanzo Babcock (1847–1922), American school superintendent
Charles Henry Babcock (1899–1967), American businessman (Babcock Graduate School of Management)
Charles L. Babcock, American Democratic politician (1962 Ohio Secretary of State elections)
Charles L. "Chip" Babcock (born 1949), American attorney
Charlie Babcock (born 1979), American actor
Charlie Babcock, character in 2006 TV series Pepper Dennis